Pasqua 79 is an Indian reserve of the Pasqua First Nation in Saskatchewan. It is 16 kilometres west of Fort Qu'Appelle. In the 2016 Canadian Census, it recorded a population of 517 living in 173 of its 200 total private dwellings. In the same year, its Community Well-Being index was calculated at 56 of 100, compared to 58.4 for the average First Nations community and 77.5 for the average non-Indigenous community.

The reserve is located on the south side of Pasqua Lake in the Qu'Appelle Valley.

Land reductions
The initial reserve allotment was  but as a result of land surrenders and government expropriations, this has since been reduced by nearly half to about

See also
List of Indian reserves in Saskatchewan

References

Indian reserves in Saskatchewan
Division No. 6, Saskatchewan
Pasqua First Nation